In mathematics, group inverse may refer to:

 the inverse element in a group or in a subgroup of another, not necessarily group structure, e.g. in a subgroup of a semigroup
 the Drazin inverse